This is a list of Landammann of Davos, Switzerland. The Landammann chairs the executive council (Kleiner Landrat) of Davos.

References 

Davos
 
Davos